Investiture (from the Latin preposition in and verb vestire, "dress" from vestis "robe") is a formal installation or ceremony that a person undergoes, often related to membership in Christian religious institutes as well as Christian knighthoods or damehoods, in addition to government offices.

In an investiture, a person may receive an outward sign of their membership, such as their religious habit, an ecclesiastical decoration (as with chivalric orders) or a scapular (as with confraternities); they may be given the authority and regalia of a high office. Investiture can include formal dress and adornment such as robes of state or headdress, or other regalia such as a throne or seat of office. An investiture is also often part of a coronation rite or enthronement.

Christianity

Religious institutes
Investiture indicates in religious orders the usually ceremonial handing over of the religious habit to a new novice. The investiture usually takes place upon admission to the novitiate (rarely only upon profession). The investiture which takes place either as part of a liturgical celebration in the choir of the church or in the community's chapter house.

In some places, a slightly shorter or even a white habit is lent to dress up, which is then exchanged for one in the way that the other professed people wear at the first profession. In some religious orders for women, the white veil of the novice is exchanged for a black veil when taking temporary vows (simple profession), while others only give the black veil for solemn profession.

Confraternities
Joining a confraternity (such as the Confraternity of the Immaculate Conception) occurs through an investiture, in which one is given a scapular as an outward mark of their membership.

A Christian is made a knight or dame through an investiture, as with the Order of Saint John (Bailiwick of Brandenburg), a chivalric order.

Government
Investiture is the installation of individuals in institutions that usually have been extant from feudal times. For example, the installation of heads of state and various other state functions with ceremonial roles are invested with office. Usually, the investiture involves ceremonial transfer of the symbol of the particular office.

Judges in many countries, including justices of the Supreme Court of the United States, are invested with their office. American justices typically take two oaths: one to uphold the Constitution of the United States, and the other to apply justice equally. Likewise, university presidents, rectors and chancellors are invested with office.

Other uses

In the United Kingdom, around 2,600 people are invested personally by King Charles III or another member of the royal family each year. A list of those to be honoured is published twice a year, in either the New Year Honours or the Birthday Honours. Approximately 25 investitures are held annually, most in the Ballroom at Buckingham Palace, although the Waterloo Chamber in Windsor Castle and the Palace of Holyroodhouse in Edinburgh, Scotland, are also used. In 2014 The then-Prince of Wales held an investiture at Hillsborough Castle in Northern Ireland. Investitures are also held in other Commonwealth realms, when the governor-general acts on behalf of the King. 

The poem "The Investiture" by English poet, writer, and soldier Siegfried Sassoon is about a young man who was killed in battle during World War I.

The term is used in the Scouting movement when enrolling a new youth member or an existing member is moving to a different section such as from Cubs to Scouts, and for the ceremony in which a new member declares their commitment to Scouting traditions.

In Brandon Sanderson's Cosmere fictional universe, investiture is an underlying mechanic of magic.

See also
 Consecration of a bishop or of a church 
 Coronation and anointing, equivalent terms for the assumption of royal office
 Enthronement, an equivalent term used for royal and episcopal office
 Investiture controversy of Middle Ages
 Ordination

References

External links

Queen Elizabeth investiture (knighting) ceremony at Buckingham Palace. on YouTube
Governor-General of New Zealand, Investiture ceremonies.

Ceremonies
Investiture Controversy
State ritual and ceremonies